The surname or nickname Rebel may refer to:

Hans Rebel (1861–1940), Austrian entomologist
Jean-Féry Rebel (1666–1747), French Baroque composer and violinist
François Rebel (1701–1775), French Baroque composer and violinist, son of Jean-Féry
Jett Rebel (born 1991), Dutch singer-songwriter
Johnny Rebel (singer) (born 1938), Cajun country musician Clifford Joseph Trahan
Lise-Lotte Rebel (born 1951), Danish Lutheran bishop
Tony Rebel (born 1992), Jamaican reggae deejay Patrick George Anthony Barrett
Robbie Rebel, The Beano comic character

See also
Rebel (given name)